is a Japanese seinen manga series written and illustrated by manga author .

Plot
The series is a comedic romance between two high-school fujoshi and the boys who fall in love with them; much of the humor comes from parodies of stereotypical fujoshi behavior and other otaku topics, and a large number of pop culture references.

Release
It was first serialized in Japan on April 12, 2006, in Futabasha's seinen manga magazine Comic High!. The series has been licensed in the United States by Media Blasters. It was adapted into a live action drama in 2007. The series was available in English in digital format from JManga under the title Otaku-Type Delusion Girl. It has been released in French by  Bamboo Edition's Doki-Doki imprint under the title Otaku Girls.

Volumes

Reception
The Media Blasters translation of Fujoshi Rumi released to mixed positive reviews, with Anime News Network giving the first two volumes an overall B−, stating "There are a number of typos in the first volume, and several text boxes and balloons are missing words in the second. ... Even so, Fujoshi Rumi is without a doubt one of Media Blasters' best manga releases to date and far and away the best in quite a long time." Pop Culture Shock also reviewed the first two volumes, praising the series' humor, translation notes, and pop culture references. Sequential Tart called the series a "fan-friendly little bubble of fictional high school life".

References

External links

2006 manga
Seinen manga
Japanese drama television series
Media Blasters
Futabasha manga